Jan G. Swartz  is an American businesswoman. She is the Group President of Holland America Group, responsible for Princess Cruises, Holland America Line, Seabourn and P&O Australia, as well as Holland America Princess Alaska Tours and inter-group operations.

Early life and education
Swartz earned her Bachelor of Arts from the University of Virginia and her MBA from Harvard Business School. Growing up in Texas, she was a Girl Guide.

Career

After graduating from Harvard Business School, Swartz and her husband moved to Los Angeles were she accepted a position with Bain and Company Incorporated. In 1997, she joined Princess Cruises as an outside management consultant. From there, she joined MXG Media in 1999 as Chief Executive Officer, where she oversaw online, catalog, magazine and television ventures. In 2001, Swartz was appointed the Princess Cruises's vice president of strategy and business development.

From 2008 until 2013, Swartz served as the Executive Vice President of Princess Cruises' Sales, Marketing and Customer Service. In her last year as Executive Vice President, Swartz was appointed President of Princess Cruises. Two years after her promotion, she was named the Girl Scouts of Greater Los Angeles Woman of Distinction.

In 2016, Swartz was promoted to group president of Princess Cruises and Carnival Australia. Two years later, Swartz was appointed to MGM Resorts International Board of Directors. In December 2020, she was appointed group president of Holland America Group, responsible for Princess Cruises, Holland America Line, Seabourn and P&O Australia, as well as Holland America Princess Alaska Tours and inter-group operations.

Personal life
Swartz is married to television executive Rob Swartz and together they have two daughters.

References 

Living people
Businesspeople from Houston
American women business executives
Carnival Corporation & plc people
Harvard Business School alumni
University of Virginia alumni
Year of birth missing (living people)
21st-century American women